Pat Leonard may refer to:
Patrick Leonard, American songwriter
Patricia Leonard, British singer with the D'Oyly Carte Opera Company
Patrick Leonard (footballer), Scottish professional footballer